Rainer Zietlow  is a German world record holder, long distance driver and owner of the Challenge4 agency in Mannheim, Germany. Three of his long-distance records and two altitude records are or were officially registered at Guinness World Records.

Activities 
In 1988 Rainer Zietlow crossed the Sahara to Niger in a Mercedes 230. In 1990 he crossed the  Sahara to Cameroon in a Toyota Land Cruiser BJ 55. In 1996 Rainer Zietlow drove around the world in a Land Rover Defender 110 in six months.

Challenge4 
In 2004 Rainer Zietlow founded the agency Challenge4 GmbH. It specializes in the planning and realization of international long-distance and record-breaking tours. Since 2005, the agency has run 20 successful projects.

SOS Children's Village 
With a few exceptions, Rainer Zietlow has supported the international children's aid organization SOS Children's Villages since 2004 with each of his world record or long-distance tours by handing over a donation during a village visit on site.

World record and long distance rides (2005 to 2021)

References

External links 
 "Rainer Zietlow World Record Drive Dakar Moscow", YouTube, 
 "Neil Huffman Volkswagen Hosts the VW ID.4 USA Tour - Rainer Zietlow", YouTube, 
 "Rainer Zietlow, The Journey with VW Touareg", YouTube, 

Year of birth missing (living people)
Living people
Sports world record holders
Sportspeople from Mannheim
21st-century German people
German motorsport people